Abadzekhskaya is a rural locality (a stanitsa) in Maykopsky District of the Republic of Adygea, Russia, located on the Belaya River  south of Maykop. Population:

References

Rural localities in Maykopsky District